German United Evangelical Church Complex, also known as Salem Evangelical Church (1921), Salem Evangelical and Reformed Church (1943), and Salem United Church of Christ (1957), is a historic Evangelical and Reformed church complex located at Rochester in Monroe County, New York.  The complex includes the original church structure (1874) with attached wing (1895) and the later parish house and church school (1923).

It was listed on the National Register of Historic Places in 1992.

Gallery

References

External links
Salem United Church of Christ

Churches in Rochester, New York
Churches on the National Register of Historic Places in New York (state)
Churches completed in 1874
19th-century Protestant churches
National Register of Historic Places in Rochester, New York